Stovepipe may refer to:

 Exhaust pipe

Clothing
 Stovepipe hat, a tall top hat with a consistent width
 Stovepipe pants, style of slim-fit pants also known as drainpipes

Information technology
 Stovepipe (organisation), where the structure of the organization restricts flow of information through rigid lines of control
 Stovepipe system or stovepiping, the informal name given to a category of criticisms applied to assemblages of technology
 Stovepiping, the use of improper channels to pass unvetted information to policy-makers

People
 Stovepipe Johnson (1834–1922), American Civil War colonel
 Daddy Stovepipe (1867–1963), African-American blues singer

Other uses
 Stovepipe Cup, a design of the NHL's Stanley Cup, in use from 1927 to 1947
 Stovepipe (instrument), a musical instrument often used in jug bands
 Stovepipe jam, a type of firearm malfunction
 Stovepipe (play), by Adam Brace
 Stovepipe tornado, storm chaser slang for a large cylindrically-shaped tornado

See also
 Stovepipe Wells, California, a small way-station in Death Valley, US
 Stovepipe Wells Airport, an airport in California, US
 Devil's stovepipe, a hole formed when a tree that has been buried by an encroaching sand dune decomposes